Prestonella bowkeri is a species of air-breathing land snail, terrestrial pulmonate gastropod molluscs in the family Bothriembryontidae.

It was previously classified within Prestonellidae. cf.

Prestonella bowkeri is the type species of the genus Prestonella.

Distribution
This species is endemic to Eastern Cape, South Africa.

References

External links 
 photo of Prestonella bowkeri

Endemic fauna of South Africa
Bothriembryontidae
Gastropods described in 1889